Michigan's 34th Senate district is one of 38 districts in the Michigan Senate. The 34th district was created in 1953, as dictated by the 1908 Michigan Constitution. The previous 1850 constitution only allowed for 32 senate districts. It has been represented by Republican Jon Bumstead since 2019, succeeding fellow Republican Goeff Hansen.

Geography
District 34 encompasses all of Clare, Gladwin, Gratiot, Isabella, Mecosta, and Osceola counties, as well as parts of Bay, Clinton, Lake, Midland, and Saginaw counties.

2011 Apportionment Plan
District 34, as dictated by the 2011 Apportionment Plan, was based in Muskegon, covered all of Muskegon County as well as nearby Newaygo and Oceana Counties. Other communities in the district included Norton Shores, Muskegon Heights, North Muskegon, Roosevelt Park, Whitehall, Wolf Lake, Hart, Fremont, Muskegon Township, and Fruitport Township.

The district was located entirely within Michigan's 2nd congressional district, and overlapped with the 91st, 92nd, and 100th districts of the Michigan House of Representatives. Much of the district lied along Lake Michigan.

List of senators

Recent election results

2018

2014

Federal and statewide results in District 34

Historical district boundaries

References 

34
Muskegon County, Michigan
Newaygo County, Michigan
Oceana County, Michigan